Nadine Schatzl (born 19 November 1993) is a Hungarian handballer for Győri ETO KC and the Hungarian national team.

Achievements
Nemzeti Bajnokság I:
Winner: 2011, 2012, 2021, 2022
Magyar Kupa:
Winner: 2011, 2012, 2017
Finalist: 2019, 2022
Third place: 2015, 2016, 2018, 2021
EHF Champions League:
Finalist: 2012, 2022

Individual awards
 Hungarian Handballer of the Year: 2019
 Møbelringen Cup 2017: All-Star Left Wing

Personal life
Schatzl was born in Munich, Germany to Hungarian parents. Her parents moved to Germany in the late 1980s and then moved back to Hungary when Nadine was 10 years old. Her paternal grandfather is Swabian.

References

External links

1993 births
Living people
Sportspeople from Munich
Hungarian female handball players
Győri Audi ETO KC players
Ferencvárosi TC players (women's handball)
Hungarian people of German descent
German people of Hungarian descent
Handball players at the 2020 Summer Olympics